Yahir Acuña (born September 30, 1980) is a Colombian politician. He was a Member of the Colombian House of Representatives representing Sincelejo, Sucre. In 2015, he resigned from House of Representatives to run for the governorship of Sucre and named his wife as a candidate. As of December 31, 2015, he faced a total of 13 disciplinary and criminal investigations file against him by the Colombian Justice Department.  Two days before the elections, Acuña was confiscated 487million pesos in cash by the Colombian highway police.

References 

Living people
1980 births
People from Sincelejo
Colombian politicians
Citizen Option politicians
Members of the Chamber of Representatives of Colombia
21st-century Colombian politicians